Uran Xhafa (born 1951) is an Albanian former footballer. He played in three matches for the Albania national football team from 1973 to 1981.

References

External links
 

1951 births
Living people
Albanian footballers
Albania international footballers
Place of birth missing (living people)
Association footballers not categorized by position
Albanian football managers
Flamurtari Vlorë managers